Villegouin is a commune in the Indre department in central France.

Geography
The Indrois has its source in the commune.

Population

See also
Communes of the Indre department

References

Communes of Indre